Shazia Jannat Marri (born 8 October 1972) is a Pakistani politician and Federal Minister for Benazir Income Support Programme. She has been a member of the National Assembly of Pakistan since August 2018 and current Minister for Poverty Alleviation and Social Safety. Previously she was a member of the National Assembly from July 2012 to August 2013 and again from August 2013 to May 2018.

Early life and education
She was born on 8 October 1972 in Karachi to Deputy Speaker of the Sindh Assembly Atta Muhammad Marri.

Her grandfather Ali Muhammad was also politician and was member of legislative assembly during British government from 1944 to 1945. Moreover, her mother Parveen Marri has also remained member of Sindh Assembly during 1985–86. She has a BA degree.

Political career

She was elected to Provincial Assembly of Sindh on 2002 Pakistani general election.

She served as Provincial Minister of Sindh for Electric before appointed as Provincial Minister of Sindh for Information from 2008 to 2010.

She was re-elected to Provincial Assembly of Sindh in 2008 Pakistani general election from PS-133 on reserved seat for women, representing Pakistan Peoples Party (PPP). In July 2012, she resigned from the seat.

In July 2012, she was elected to the National Assembly of Pakistan as a candidate of PPP on a seat reserved for women from Sindh.

She ran for the seat of National Assembly in 2013 Pakistani general election from NA-235 (Sanghar-II), but was unsuccessful.

She was re-elected to the National Assembly of Pakistan on reserved seat for women in 2013 election.

In July 2013, she was elected to the National Assembly in by-election from NA-235 (Sanghar-II).

She was re-elected to the National Assembly as a candidate of PPP from Constituency NA-216 (Sanghar-II) in 2018 Pakistani general election. In the same election, she was re-elected to the National Assembly as a candidate of PPP on a seat reserved for women from Sindh.

References

1972 births
Living people
Baloch politicians
Sindh MPAs 2002–2007
Sindh MPAs 2008–2013
Pakistani MNAs 2008–2013
Pakistani MNAs 2013–2018
Pakistan People's Party MNAs
Politicians from Karachi
Provincial ministers of Sindh
Women provincial ministers of Sindh
Women members of the National Assembly of Pakistan
Pakistani MNAs 2018–2023
21st-century Pakistani women politicians